Punha Gondhal Punha Mujara (Marathi:पुन्हा गोंधळ पुन्हा मुजरा) is a 2014 Marathi political comedy film starring Makarand Anaspure and Sayaji Shinde. The film is a sequel of 2009 Marathi film Gallit Gondhal Dillit Mujra and marked the debut of Bollywood actors Alok Nath and Ashish Vidyarthi in Marathi cinema.

Plot
The story of this film revolves around two politicians from the same village.
One of them is an elected MLA from Village constituency Narayan Wagh (Makarand Anaspure) and the other being his opponent Vishwasrao Tope(Sayaji Shinde), who has lost the election to Mr. Wagh by a narrow margin. But, Vishwasrao manages to get this nomination as MLC. So, to prove their supremacy, they indulge themselves in dirty politics, so as to turn the tables on each other. And, this clearly goes on to show how murky the politics is at the village level.

Cast
 Makarand Anaspure as Narayan Wagh
 Sayaji Shinde as Vishwasrao Tope
 Ashish Vidyarthi
 Alok Nath

Release
The film released all over maharashtra on 10 October 2014. Upon release the film received mixed reviews from the audience. The film collected ₹80 lakh on its first day of release.

Soundtrack
Music of the film was composed by Shashank Powar & Sandeep Jamdar. The album contains 2 songs. Hou Dya Kharch, sung by Reshma Sonawne was an instant hit among the Marathi people.

References

External links
 

2010s Marathi-language films
2014 films
Indian political drama films 
Indian comedy films